The Compendium Archive 1996–2006 is a compilation album by American metal band Agalloch. It was released through Licht Von Dämmerung Arthouse on March 20, 2010. The album was limited to 250 hand-numbered copies, and was sold exclusively at the band's two Romanian gigs in March 2010.

Track listing

Personnel
 John Haughm – guitar, percussion, vocals
 Don Anderson – guitar
 Shane Breyer – vocals
 Jason William Walton – bass

References

External links
 Agalloch at MySpace

Agalloch albums
2010 compilation albums